The  (with a long second ā) are persons descended, or claiming descent, from the family of the prophet Muhammad.

 (with a short second a) is an Arabic word meaning 'most noble'.

Ashraf may also refer to:

Asharaf or Ashraf, a Somali clan claiming descent from Muhammad
Ashraf, East Azerbaijan, a village in Keyvan Rural District, in the Central District of Khoda Afarin County, East Azerbaijan Province, Iran
Ashraf (name), including a list of people with this name
Behshahr, formerly Ashraf or Ashraf ol Belād, a city in Mazandaran, Iran
Camp Ashraf, a camp in Iraq's Diyala province, headquarters of the exiled People's Mujahedin of Iran (PMOI/MEK)
List of Ashrāf tribes in Libya

See also
 Al-Ashraf (disambiguation)